Microgramma megalophylla is a species of epiphytic fern, native to tropical South America. It is a myrmecophyte, producing domatia in its rhizome which ants live.

References

Polypodiaceae